Frederick William Moorhead KC (1863 – 27 November 1902) was an Australian barrister, politician, and judge. He was born in Ireland and emigrated to Western Australia in 1889. Moorhead was a member of the Legislative Assembly of Western Australia from 1899 to 1901, and briefly served as the state's attorney-general in the government of Alf Morgans. He was appointed to the Supreme Court of Western Australia in April 1902, but died after only seven months in office.

Early life
Moorhead was born in King's County, Ireland, to Elizabeth (née Humphrys) and Michael J. Moorhead. He attended St Stanislaus College before going on to the University of Dublin, where he studied arts and laws. He was called to the bar in 1887. In his youth, Moorhead was a talented association football player. A representative of Dublin University A.F.C., he played a single match for the Irish national team, appearing against England during the 1884–85 British Home Championship. Moorhead moved to Australia in 1889, and opened a law firm in Perth. He was admitted to the Western Australian bar the following year.

Parliamentary career
Moorhead first attempted to enter parliament at an 1895 Legislative Council by-election for Central Province, but lost to William Alexander (by only seven votes). At the 1897 general election, he stood for the Legislative Assembly, but lost to Henry Kenny in the seat of North Murchison. However, Kenny died in August 1899, and Moorhead was successful at the resulting by-election. He was re-elected at the 1901 general election.

In November 1901, Alf Morgans replaced George Leake as premier, and appointed Moorhead as attorney-general in his new ministry. Under the state constitution at the time, newly appointed ministers were required to resign and recontest their seats in a ministerial by-election. These were often uncontested, but the outgoing premier, Leake, organised opposing candidates in each seat. Moorhead and two other ministers (Matthew Moss and Frank Wilson) were defeated, resulting in the collapse of the Morgans government after just over a month.

Later life
After his electoral defeat, Moorhead returned to his law practice. He had been appointed Queen's Counsel (QC) in 1900, and was regarded as one of the most capable barristers in the state. In April 1902, Moorhead was appointed as a puisne judge of the Supreme Court, joining Edward Stone (the chief justice), Alfred Hensman (who died in October 1902), and Stephen Henry Parker on the bench. Prior to his appointment, the court had had only three justices, but an additional justice was deemed necessary to alleviate their workload. However, in November 1902, Moorhead suffered a mental and physical breakdown. He had suffered from locomotor ataxia since an accident in 1897, but his breakdown brought on what was described as a "general paralysis", which he never recovered from.

Moorhead died at his home in West Perth in late November. His funeral was held two days later at St Mary's Cathedral, Perth, and he was afterward buried in Karrakatta Cemetery. Moorhead had married Amy Campbell (née Monger) in 1891, with whom he had one daughter, but he was widowed in 1900. His wife was a daughter of John Henry Monger and a sister of Frederick Charles Monger, both of whom were members of parliament.

References

1863 births
1902 deaths
Alumni of Trinity College Dublin
Attorneys-General of Western Australia
Australian barristers
Australian King's Counsel
Irish barristers
Irish emigrants to Australia
Judges of the Supreme Court of Western Australia
Members of the Western Australian Legislative Assembly
People educated at University College School
People from County Offaly
Pre-1950 IFA international footballers
Public servants of Western Australia
Irish association footballers (before 1923)
19th-century Australian politicians
Dublin University A.F.C. players
Sportspeople from County Offaly
Association footballers not categorized by position
Burials at Karrakatta Cemetery